Cirque du Soleil: Worlds Away is a 2012 American 3D family fantasy film directed by Andrew Adamson. The film premiered on October 20, 2012 at the Tokyo International Film Festival, and was released theatrically in the United States on December 21, 2012.

Distributed worldwide by Paramount Pictures on December 21, 2012, the film tells the story of a girl named Mia going to a traveling circus and falling in love with its main attraction, the Aerialist. After the Aerialist falls during his act, he and Mia are transported to another world where each encounter the different worlds of Cirque du Soleil. It stars Erica Linz and Igor Zaripov as the main characters and incorporates acts from O, Mystère, Kà, Love, Zumanity, Criss Angel Believe, and Viva Elvis, some of the Cirque du Soleil shows that were running in Las Vegas in 2011.

Eels performed a song titled "Calling for Your Love" for the movie.

Plot
Mia, a young woman in a small American Midwestern town, goes to a traveling carnival one evening, where she is urged by a silent clown to visit the carnival's circus and see the Aerialist, the show's star attraction. She is entranced by the Aerialist, but during his act he misses a catch and falls to the ground. She rushes to help him, but then the ground beneath them gives way and they fall into the dreamlike world of Cirque du Soleil. Separated, they travel through the different tent worlds trying to find each other, interacting with the strange and wonderful performers and performances of Cirque du Soleil. Mia and the Aerialist perform an aerial courtship for the grand finale.

Cast

 Justin Fletcher
 John Sparkes
 Amalia Vitale
 Kate Harbour
 Dallas Barnett as Boss
 Tanya Drewery
 Sarah Houbolt
 Ascia Maybury
 Damien Gordon
 Zach Brickland
 Iren Goed
 Roufan Gan
 Pei Pei Lane
 Shaowei Xin
 Stephen Cooper
 Mengkai Shi
 James Fletcher
 Wenbo Zheng
 Mariska du Plessis
 Dan Hales
 Graham Candy
 Mike Baker
 Matt Gillanders
 Alan Thompson
 John Abraham
 Peter McPhail
 Maria Akhlatkina
 Alifia Alimova
 Zulfia Alimova
 Terry Bartlett
 Oomaa Bayartsogt
 Suzannah Bianco
 Stephen Bland
 P.J. Bogart
 Irina Borbounewitch
 Cinthia Bouhier
 Brynn Butzman
 Jorge Castano
 Luydmyla Chovhun
 Alexander Clements
 Johanne Clerk
 Jonathan Cole
 Danut Coseru
 Pierre Cottin
 Natalia Custurova
 Alessandro D'Agostini
 Namchinkhand Damba-Kaye
 Enkhjargal Dashbaljir
 Benjamin Deschamps
 Naranglia Dulamsuren
 Sylvie Dumaine
 Yuliya Eremina
 Junior Faitau
 Tatiana Frolova
 Olessia Gaidych
 Saraana Gantumur
 Aleksandr Gorshkov
 Daniel Headecker
 Yun Jin Hong
 Zoltan Jobbagy
 Andy Jones
 Erez Kaplan
 Evgeny Karasev
 Mika Kawabe
 Valerie Keft
 Kanako Kitao
 Miho Kono
 Toumany Kouyaté
 Kari Kreitzer
 Sergei Kuorovich
 Mikhail Lashchuk
 Caroline Lauzon
 Qiang Lei
 Julia Lopatkina
 Chelsea Luker
 Dena Massaro
 John Manson
 Bill May
 Noara Mello
 Anna Melnikova
 Tatyana Mironovich
 Benedikt Negro
 Tatiana Nikitenko
 Justice Orion
 Zipporah Peddle
 Eric Plante
 Kurt Rasmussen
 Steven Isijia Reynolds
 Briana Shaw Rüssi
 Volodymyr Rozbitskyy
 Regina Rufenacht
 Karl Sanft
 Chantale Sauvageau
 Katy Savoie
 Daria Shemiakina
 Paul Emile Shihadeh
 Natalia Sigwarth
 Craig Paul Smith
 Elena Solodowniküva
 Cristian Stefanescu
 Irina Syrova
 Isabelle Thomas
 Jozsef Tokar
 Florian Toussaint
 Turchmeg Turbat
 Olena Usik
 Norbert Virag
 Ray Wold
 Anja Wyttenbach
 Mai Yamamoto
 Anna Zarianova
 Vladimir Zibrov
 Francisco Alegria
 Sabu Alegria
 Andrian Nikolaev Angelov
 Ge Bai
 Jason Biltz
 Jeana Blackman
 Sergiy Bobrovnik
 Rochelle Collins
 Janine De Lorenzo
 Florent Deplanche
 Julie Duflos
 Yan Chao
 Nicolle Ford
 Hubert Gall
 Gail Gilbert
 Darin Good
 Sarah Guillot-Guyard
 Peng Guo
 Johan Guy
 Mathieu Guyard
 Jennifer Haight
 Cheri Haight
 Lionel Hamel
 Jason Hardabura
 Eric J. Henderson
 Marylène Hickock
 Vitaly Hudzenko
 Eric Jeffers
 Zeng Jiao Jian
 Derek Philip Jones
 Peter Kismartoni
 Emmanuel Kizayilawoko
 Jörg Lemke
 Dan Hong Li
 Zhong Zhi Lu
 Victoria Lubecki
 Tej Limlas Ly
 Teng-Meng Ly
 Chao Ma
 Summer Marik
 Brien McCrea
 Julie McInnes
 Brahim Meslem
 Ivan Mokrousov
 Emma Nicholson
 Gabryel Nogueira
 Reinaldo Noguti
 Spencer Novich
 Richard Oberacker
 Leonardo Oliveira Santos
 Jamie Pannucci
 Julia Parrot
 Mikhail Petrov
 Dongxing Qiu
 Robert Louis Robinson Jr.
 Matthew Salcedo
 Sami Saula
 Eric Scribner
 Chang Jun Shao
 Grygory Shevchenko
 Kun Shi
 Ya Hui Sun
 Pierre-Luc Sylvain
 Noriko Takahashi
 Arisa Takami
 Kelly Tucker
 Altanzul Ulambayar
 Su Ming Zhang
 Guangsheng Zou
 Jason Zulauf
 Jonas Zuniga
 Haoyuen Chen
 Alexander Dryjenko
 Roman Ermolenkov
 Sébastian Fortier
 Florence Gaillard
 Yevgen Kuz'min
 Xun Li
 Petro Marakhovskyy
 Alexandre Plotnikov
 Andrei Ridetski
 Dimitry Vorobiev
 Derrick Aldrich
 Lorin-Pierre Andre
 Andy Howard
 Wellington Lima
 David Locke
 Sheila Joy Buford
 Gyulnara Karaeva
 Sylvia Aderne
 Ekaterina Arnaoutova
 Joel Baker
 Marina Boutina
 Eugen Brim
 Marin Britten
 Tina Cannon
 Gianni Cardinale
 Kristofer Carrison
 Eve Castelo Branco
 Jimmie Cervera
 Roshan Chopra
 Jason Chu
 Ekenah Claudin
 Nathan Cooper
 Laura Cota
 Ryan Dawes
 Marco De Santi
 Youssef El Toufali
 Ryan Elrod
 Marc Englehart
 Reed Evans
 Delphine Gaillard
 Halil Gashi
 Mike Goodenough
 Wieslaw Haczkiewicz
 Ronald Harris
 Carrie Helms
 Khetanya Henderson
 Gaz Hopkins
 Joel Howard
 Tal Iozef
 Meredith Kerr
 Leisha Knight
 Alina Leiva
 Mariana Rodrigues Maekawa
 Ghislain Malardier
 Kishema Pendu Malik
 Cosmin Malita
 Marian Malita
 Nnete Campbell Manyesa
 Sandrine Mattei
 Bernhardt Mattes
 Cameron McKinlay
 Tumelo Michael Moloi
 Mukhtar Omar Sharif Mukhtar
 Charlotte O Dowd
 Rares Iulian Orzata
 Nolan Padilla
 Dakotah Rhoades
 Mason Roberts
 Melena Rounis
 Dmitro Rybikin
 David Schexnayder
 David Shay
 Taras Shevchenko
 Vladimir Sosnin
 Jonathan Strong
 Alexander Strownov
 Jake Van Orden
 Anne Weissbecker
 Rob Winch
 Wallace Zernich
 Kyle Zingler
 Chris Silcox
 Nicolas Bosc

Soundtrack

Reception
This film received mixed reviews from critics. It has a rating of 45% on Rotten Tomatoes, based on 47 reviews and an average score of 5.30/10. The site's critics consensus reads, "Cirque Du Soleil loses its sense of wonder when bottled for the screen, with Worlds Away's shapeless story and relentless spectacle feeling hollow when divorced from the theatrical experience." On Metacritic, it has a rating of 51 out of 100, indicating "mixed or average reviews", based on 16 reviews.

A. O. Scott of The New York Times gave this film a score of 3/5, and said that "For me, Cirque du Soleil will always be associated with the movie Knocked Up, in which the characters played by Seth Rogen and Paul Rudd take in a performance of Mystère under the influence of hallucinogenic mushrooms. If such a trip is not to your taste, or if a trip to Las Vegas is not on your calendar, you might opt for the relatively inexpensive, mildly mind-blowing Cirque du Soleil: Worlds Away, a new 3-D movie directed by Andrew Adamson."

Awards

Home video
On March 12, 2013, Worlds Away was released on DVD and Blu-ray.

References

External links
 
 
 

Cirque du Soleil shows
2012 films
Films directed by Andrew Adamson
Films produced by Aron Warner
Paramount Pictures films
Films with screenplays by Andrew Adamson
Films without speech
2012 fantasy films
Circus films
IMAX films
Reel FX Creative Studios films
2010s English-language films
2010s American films